Esteban Benzecry (born 1970) is an Argentine classical composer.

Early years
Benzecry was born in Lisbon, Portugal, in 1970 to Argentine parents. He grew up in Argentina where he studied musical composition with Sergio Hualpa and Haydee Gerardi. He moved to Paris in 1997, where he studied composition with Jacques Charpentier, Professor of the Conservatoire Superieur de Paris. He obtained the "Premier Prix a l'unanimitè" in composition in 1999. He also studied composition with Paul Méfano, and Electro acoustic music with Luis Naón and Laurent Cuniot. He became a French citizen in 2011.

Career
In 1992 he was named "The young revelation of the Season" by the Musical Critics Association of Argentina.  The same association awarded him with the prize "The best Argentine work premiered in the Season 1994, 2006, 2009, 2017". He has been a fellow of the Interamerican Music Friends of Washington (USA), Mozarteum Argentino, and Academie des Beaux-Arts de l'Institut de France. In 1995 he was invited as Resident Composer at the Yehudi Menuhin Academy (Switzerland).

The Academie des Beaux-Arts de l'Institut de France awarded him the prize from the Foundation Delmas in 1999, the prize Tronchet in 2002, and the prize Georges Wildenstein in 2006. In 2004, he received the Fondation groupe d’entreprise Natexis Banques Populaires Award for music. He is Resident Composer at the Casa de Velazquez of Madrid for 2004–2006 (Academie de France a Madrid). In 2008 he received a Guggenheim Fellowship for Music Composition. In 2019 he receives the Konex Platinum award as the best composer of the decade in Argentina.

Compositions
He has written three symphonies. His first symphony, "El compendio de la vida" (1993) was inspired by four of his own canvases. He has also written other symphonic and chamber works. His most recent works attempt a fusion between rhythms with Latin American roots and the diverse aesthetic currents of European contemporary music creating a personal language, an imaginary folklore.

Le Monde de la musique has called him a distant heir to Villa-Lobos and Ginastera because of his imaginative use of the Latin-American musical patrimony.

Performances
His works have been played in Europe and the United States. Among the interpreters that have performed his works are: The Royal Concertgebouw Orchestra, New York Philharmonic,  Los Angeles Philharmonic, Philadelphia Orchestra, Atlanta Symphony Orchestra, Dallas Symphony Orchestra, Fort Worth Symphony Orchestra, Minnesota Orchestra, Gothenburg Symphony Orchestra, Sydney Symphony Orchestra, Helsinki Philharmonic, Tampere Philharmonic, Stavanger Symfoniorkester, Deutsche Radio Philharmonie, Hamburg Philharmoniker Orchester, Orquesta Gulbenkian of Lisbon, Orquesta Nacional de España, Orquesta Sinfonica de RTVE (Radio Televisión Española), Orchestre National de France, Orchestre Philharmonique de Radio France, Orchestre National de Montpellier, Orchestre Colonne de Paris, Orchestre de Concerts Pasdeloup, Orchestre Lamoureux, Orchestre Symphonique de Cannes-Côte d’Azur, la Sinfonietta de Paris, Orchestre de la Basse Normandie, Orchestre Universitaire de Strasbourg, l’ensemble l’Itineraire, Grup Instrumental de Valencia, Ensamble LIM, Orquesta Sinfonica National de Argentine, Orquesta Filarmonica del Teatro Colón de Buenos Aires, Orquesta Sinfónica Simón Bolívar de Venezuela, Orquesta Filarmonica Nacional de Venezuela, Orquesta Nacional de Colombia, Orquesta Filarmonica de Bogota (Colombia), Orquesta Sinfonica de Chile, Orquesta Sinfónica Nacional (Peru), l’Ensemble de l’Université Carnegie-Mellon de Pittsburgh (USA), Orchestre Symphonique de Klaipėda (Lituanie), Orquesta Sinfonica Carlos Chavez (Mexique) la Camerata Lysy – Gstaad (Suisse), la Camerata Basel (Suisse), la Camerata Bariloche (Argentine), “London’s Schubert Chamber Orchestra” (UK), Unitas Ensemble – Boston – USA, Filarmónica de Stat Targu Mures (Rumania), Kyiv Chamber Orchestra, Zaporizhzhya Symphony Orchestra, Kharkiv Philharmonic Orchestra (Ukraine), Solaris String Quartet.

His works have also been performed by renowned artists such as Gustavo Dudamel, Miguel Harth-Bedoya, Giancarlo Guerrero, Diego Matheuz, Manuel Lopez Gomez, David Alan Miller, Simone Young, Enrique Diemecke, Pablo Boggiano, Laurent Petitgirard, Alain Altinoglu, Daniel Kawka, Wolfgang Doerner, Mark Foster, Alain Pâris, Nemanja Radulovic, Rolf Schulte, Alberto Lysy, Gautier Capuçon, Sol Gabetta, Jesús Castro-Balbi, Sergio Tiempo, Horacio Lavandera, Anaïs Gaudemard, Marielle Nordmann, Ayako Tanaka among others.

His works have been performed at Carnegie Hall in New York, Lincoln Center (also in New York), Walt Disney Concert Hall in Los Angeles, Davies Symphony Hall in San Francisco, Sydney Opera House, the Concertgebouw in Amsterdam, the Royal Festival Hall in London, Philharmonie de Paris, Salle Pleyel, Salle Gaveau, Théâtre des Champs-Élysées, Théâtre Mogador, Maison de Radio France, Palais de l'Unesco de París, Palais des Festivals a Cannes, Opéra de Montpellier, Sydney Opera House, Teatro Colón de Buenos Aires, Auditorio Nacional de Madrid, Festival Rencontres d'ensembles de violoncelles de Beauvais, Concours International d'harpe Lily Laskine, Juilliard School in New York, Bard Music Festival – NY – USA, Boston Conservatory, Festival Présences de Radio France, Festival Pontino d'Italie, Festivals of Brighton and Dartington (England), Festival de Música de Islas Canarias, Festival Estoril de Portugal, Miso Music Portugal, Festival Musica Viva de Lisboa, Festival Ensems de Valencia, Festival de Morelia (Mexico), Carlos Prieto International Cello Competition – Morelia, Mexico, Festival Latinoamericano de Música de Caracas, Festival Iberoamericano de Puerto Rico, Museo Guggenheim de Bilbao, Festival BBK, Van Cliburn Foundation of Fort Worth, Concours international de piano d'Orléans, Busoni International Piano Competition.

Selected works
Orchestra
 Symphony No. 1 "El compendio de la vida" (Life's Abridgement) (1993)
 Obertura Tanguera (Hommage a Ástor Piazzolla) (1993)
 Symphony No. 2 (1996)
 Symphony No. 3 "Preludio a un nuevo milenio" (1999)
 Inti Raymi (La Fiesta del Sol de los Incas) (2001, commissioned by Musique Nouvelle en Liberté – Orchestre Colonne)
 Colores de la cruz del sur (2002, commissioned by Radio France – Orchestre National de France)
 Rituales Amerindios (2008, commissioned by Gothenburg Symphony – Swedish National Orchestra).
Pre-Columbian Tryptic for Orchestra.
I – Ehécatl ( Azteca wind god)
II – Chaac ( Maya water god) 
III – Illapa (Inca thunderclap god)
 Fantasia Mastay (2009, commissioned by the Los Angeles Philharmonic Association, music director Gustavo Dudamel)
 Clarinet concerto (2010, commissioned by the FESNOJIV Fundación del Estado para el Sistema Nacional de las Orquestas Juveniles e Infantiles de Venezuela)
 De otros cielos, otros mares... for chorus and orchestra (2011, commissioned by Orquesta y Coro de la Comunidad de Madrid).
String orchestra
 Sinfonietta Americana
 Scherzo Latino-américaine
 Mosaïque Sudaméricaine
 Quintet à cordes

Concertante
 Adagio Fantastico for violin, viola and string orchestra (1993)
 Concertino for cello and string orchestra
 Evocation d'un rêve for violin and orchestra (2005)
 Evocation d'un monde perdu for violin and orchestra (2007)
 Evocation of a lost world for violin and Chamber orchestra (2008)
 La lumière de Pacha Caman, Concerto for cello and ensemble of cellos (2000)
 Paisaje nocturne for violin and string orchestra (1994)
 Paisaje nocturne for violin and string orchestra (new version 2003)
 Concerto for violin and orchestra (2005–2007)

Large ensemble (6 or more players)
 Présage de l'Aube
 Rituales de la cruz del sur for 6 percussionists
 Tres Mitos Andinos for 10 instruments (2004)
 La sombra del Toro Rojo for 11 instruments (2005)
 Como una luz desde el infinito (Homenaje a Arriaga) for 7 instruments (2005)
 Huenu Leufu (Rio del Cielo) for 8 instruments (2006)
 Pillan Quitral – El Fuego Sagrado for 15 instruments (2006)

Chamber music
 Introduccion y Capricho for violin solo
 Toccata y Misterio for cello and piano
 Trio for piano, violin and cello
 Capricho "Sermoneta" for violin solo
 Rapsodie for clarinet and piano
 "Inti" Rapsodia for flute and piano
 Quatre pièces petites for bassoon solo
 Rapsodia Andina for cello and piano
 Viento Norte for flute solo
 Pièce for clarinet solo
 Suite "Prisme du Sud" for cello solo
 Alwa for harp
 Horizontes inexplorados for harp
 String Quintet

Piano
 Tres microclimas
 Toccata Newén

Recordings
El compendio de la Vida Editions Cosentino (IRCO 299) Orchestral Works. "El Compendio de la Vida" (Symphony n°1) – "Obertura Tanguera"- "Concertino for cello and string orchestra "- "Sinfonietta Americana".
Rapsodia Latina music for cello and piano – Lin/Castro-Balbi Duo, Toccata y Misterio, Rapsodia Andina
Con Arriaga en su segundo centenario CD Homenaje a Arriaga – Colección Fundación BBK n°14
XXX Aniversario LIM "Como una luz desde el infinito" para ensamble. Dirección: Jesús Villa Rojo LIM CD 020
Horacio Lavandera CD & DVD "Compositores Argentinos "Toccata Newén" para piano.
The Secret Garden – Noël Wan, harp  "Alwa" for harp.
SUR – Fort Worth Symphony Orchestra, Miguel Harth Bedoya, Conductor Colores de la Cruz del Sur" for Orchestra.
– FWSO LIVE – Caminos del Inka – Filarmonika Publishing

References

External links
Official Website
Musique Nouvelle en Liberte
Compositores & Interpretes argentinos
Radio France
Guggenheim Foundation page on Benzecry, accessed 4 February 2010
 Los Angeles Philharmonic page

Argentine classical composers
1970 births
Living people
Male classical composers
People from Lisbon
20th-century Argentine male artists
21st-century Argentine male artists
20th-century classical composers
21st-century classical composers
20th-century Argentine male musicians